Kingsford may refer to:

Places

 Australia
Kingsford, New South Wales
Kingsford, South Australia

 United Kingdom
Kingsford, Worcestershire, England
Kingsford, near Stewarton, Ayrshire in Scotland

 United States of America
Kingsford, Michigan
Kingsford Heights, Indiana

Other uses
Kingsford (name)
Kingsford (charcoal), a commercial brand of charcoal
Kingsford Community School, a secondary school in London
Kingsford Smith International Airport, official name of Sydney Airport